John W. Anunsen (born December 1931), was an American politician who was a member of the Oregon House of Representatives. Anunsen also worked as a businessman in the sand and gravel business.

References

1931 births
Living people
Republican Party members of the Oregon House of Representatives
Businesspeople from Portland, Oregon
Politicians from Salem, Oregon